Nectopyramis is a genus of hydrozoan belonging to the family Prayidae.

The genus has almost cosmopolitan distribution (oceans).

Species:
 Nectopyramis natans (Bigelow, 1911) 
 Nectopyramis thetis Bigelow, 1911

References

Prayidae
Hydrozoan genera